Jukun (Njikun), or more precisely Jukun Takum, is a Jukunoid language of Cameroon used as a trade language in Nigeria. Though there are only a few thousand native speakers, and only a dozen in Nigeria (as of 2000), it is spoken as a second language in Nigeria by tens of thousands (40,000 reported in 1979).

The name Jukun is a cover term for several related Jukunoid languages, such as the much more numerous Jukun Wapan.

Wase Tofa is listed by Blench (2019) as a dialect.

References

Jukunoid languages
Languages of Nigeria
Languages of Cameroon